Niall Aadya Mason (born 10 January 1997) is an English professional footballer footballer who plays as a defender for Al Shahaniya.

He was born in Brighton, and played youth football for Real Madrid, Al Sadd, Blackburn Rovers and Southampton before he signed his first professional deal at Villa. He went on to play for Doncaster Rovers and Peterborough United.

Early life 
Niall Mason was born in Brighton in 1997 to an American father and an Indian mother. The family spent time living in Spain and Qatar. Mason is eligible to play for Qatar, the United States or England. He has said that he would like to play for Qatar if the opportunity arose.

As a 7-year-old, Mason was signed by the Real Madrid academy. When David Beckham visited the academy the two would often converse, as they were the only English players at the club. He also played alongside Zinedine Zidane's sons, Enzo and Luca. He went on to play for the Al Sadd academy in Qatar when his parents moved there for work and then signed for Blackburn Rovers at the age of 13.

In his early days Mason played in advanced positions, but he has gradually moved further down the pitch and now plays mostly as a defender or defensive midfielder.

Career

Aston Villa 
Mason signed his first contract with Aston Villa in 2015, after turning down a professional contract in order to join Aston Villa. Following a successful trial, he became a regular for Villa's under 21s.

He joined the first team for a summer 2015 training camp in Faro, Portugal under manager Tim Sherwood.

Doncaster Rovers 
On 6 August 2016, Mason joined Doncaster Rovers on loan until January alongside Chelsea's Jordan Houghton. Both players made their debut on the same day, in a 3–2 loss to Accrington Stanley. On 1 January 2017, Mason had his loan extended until the end of the season.

On 8 May 2017 Doncaster Rovers signed Mason permanently from Aston Villa for an undisclosed fee. He scored his first goal on 23 December that year, a penalty that was the only goal of a victory away to Bristol Rovers. Three days later, he scored in the same way in a 3–0 win over Northampton Town at the Keepmoat Stadium.

Mason was a regular under Darren Ferguson and then Grant McCann, but was suspended in January 2019 following his conviction. In March 2019, Mason was sacked from Doncaster Rovers as a result of his conviction for sexual assault.

Peterborough United 
In June 2019 he signed for Peterborough United. He scored his first goal for the club in an EFL Trophy tie against Burton Albion on 8 September 2020.

On 11 May 2021 it was announced that he would leave Peterborough at the end of his contract. He scored his first and only league goal for The Posh in his final appearance for the club against his former side Doncaster a few days beforehand.

In August 2021, Mason had a brief trial at Dundee. His presence led to fan protests over his conviction.

In December 2021, Mason returned to Qatar and after a spell playing for Lusail, he joined Qatari Second Division side Al Shahaniya.

Career statistics

Personal life
Niall Mason was convicted of a sexual offence in January 2019, after pleading guilty to a charge relating to 18 February 2018. Prior to his appearance in court, Mason had maintained his innocence and continued his playing career. He was sentenced to six months in prison, suspended for two years and was placed on to the sex offenders register for seven years. Following the sentencing Mason claimed to have been advised to plead guilty by his legal team but continued to assert his innocence.

References

External links 
 

Living people
1997 births
Footballers from Brighton
English footballers
English people of American descent
English people of Indian descent
Association football defenders
Aston Villa F.C. players
Doncaster Rovers F.C. players
Peterborough United F.C. players
English Football League players
British people convicted of sexual assault
Lusail SC players
Qatari Second Division players
English expatriate footballers
Expatriate footballers in Qatar
English expatriate sportspeople in Qatar